Seatter is a surname. Notable people with the surname include:

Michael Seatter (1945–2008), English rugby player and footballer
Natasha Seatter (born 1993), Malaysian racing driver

See also
Satter